Father Peter Heier (September 16, 1895 – March 24, 1982), S.V.D. was a Roman Catholic priest of Hague, North Dakota.

Peter Heier was the son of George and Magdalena (Wolf) Heier. He was born in Kleinliebental (today Malodolynske/Малодолинське), Ukraine. His family immigrated to the United States and settled in North Dakota. Heier studied for the priesthood and was stationed in Hague, North Dakota, where he also served as an exorcist. He served as a Divine Word missionary in China, where he was put in charge of a noted demonic possession case in 1926 and again in 1929, concerning a Chinese woman named Lautien in Henan, China. The case was printed up in a pamphlet entitled Begone Satan by Father Celestine Kapsner in 1928.

Heier died in Conesus, New York.

References

External links
A Sensational Expulsion of the Devil Which Occurred in Iowa in 1928 

Year of death missing
American Roman Catholic priests
Roman Catholic missionaries in China
Catholic exorcists
People from Emmons County, North Dakota
1895 births
Ukrainian emigrants to the United States
American Roman Catholic missionaries
American expatriates in China
Catholics from North Dakota
American exorcists